Tom Jones may refer to:

Arts and entertainment
Tom Jones (singer) (born 1940), Welsh singer
The History of Tom Jones, a Foundling, a novel by Henry Fielding published in 1749, often known simply as Tom Jones
Tom Jones (Philidor), a 1765 opera by Philidor based on Fielding's novel
Tom Jones (Edward German), a 1907 British comic opera by Edward German based on Fielding's novel
Tom Jones (1917 film), a British comedy film based on Fielding's novel
Tom Jones (1963 film), an Academy Award-winning film based on Fielding's novel
The History of Tom Jones: a Foundling (TV series), a 1997 BBC miniseries adaption of Fielding's novel
Tom Jones (TV program), a 1980–1981 television series starring the singer

Politicians
Tom Jones (Australian politician) (1924–2014), Australian politician
Tom Jones (South Dakota politician) (born 1940), member of the South Dakota Senate

Sports

American football
Tom Jones (end) (c. 1909–?), American college football player
Potsy Jones (Thomas Clinton Jones, 1909–1990), American football player
Tom Jones (coach) (c. 1924–2014), American football coach and college athletics administrator
Tom Jones (gridiron football) (1931–1978), American and Canadian football player

Association football (soccer)
Tom Jones (footballer, born 1899) (1899–1978), Welsh footballer
Tom Jones (footballer, born 1916), English footballer, played for Little Hulton, Accrington Stanley, Oldham Athletic and Rochdale (Wartime)
Tom Jones (footballer, born 1964), English footballer

Australian rules football
Tom Jones (footballer, born 1904) (1904–1944), Australian rules footballer
Carlyle Jones (a.k.a. Tom Jones, 1904–1951), Australian rules footballer
Tom Jones (footballer, born 1930), Australian rules footballer

Other sports
Tom Jones (baseball) (1874–1923), American baseball player
Tom Jones (cricketer) (1901–1935), Welsh cricketer
Tom Jones (athlete) (1916–1984), American Olympic runner
Tom Jones (racing driver) (1943–2015), American racing driver
Tom Jones (volleyball) (born 1956), Canadian volleyball player
Tom Jones (wrestler) (born 1982), British wrestler better known as "The UK Kid"

Other people
Tom Jones (bishop) (1903–1972), Australian bishop
Tom Jones (trade unionist) (1822–1916), British trade union activist
Tom Jones (writer) (born 1928), American librettist and lyricist
Tom Jones Jr. (1925–2014), American Navajo codetalker
Tom Parry Jones (1935–2013), Welsh scientist, inventor and entrepreneur

See also

Thom Jones (1945–2016), American writer
"The Ballad of Tom Jones", a 1998 song by Space and Cerys Matthews about the singer
Thomas Jones (disambiguation)
Tommy Jones (disambiguation)
Tom Jonas, Australian-rules footballer